Segestria is a genus of tube dwelling spiders that was first described by Pierre André Latreille in 1804.

Species
 it contains 21 species and one subspecies, found mainly in Eurasia, though some species are found in the Americas, two in North Africa, and one in New Zealand and one in Madagascar:
 Segestria bavarica C. L. Koch, 1843 — Europe to Azerbaijan
 Segestria bella Chamberlin & Ivie, 1935 — USA
 Segestria cavernicola Kulczyński, 1915 — Italy
 Segestria croatica Doleschall, 1852 — Croatia
 Segestria danzantica Chamberlin, 1924 — Mexico
 Segestria davidi Simon, 1884 — Syria
 Segestria fengi (Fomichev & Marusik, 2020) — China
 Segestria florentina (Rossi, 1790) (type) — Europe to Georgia. Introduced to Brazil, Uruguay, Argentina
 Segestria fusca Simon, 1882 — Portugal, Spain, France, Italy
 Segestria inda Simon, 1906 — India
 Segestria madagascarensis Keyserling, 1877 — Madagascar
 Segestria mirshamsii Marusik & Omelko, 2014 — Iran
 Segestria nekhaevae Fomichev & Marusik, 2020 — Tajikistan
 Segestria nipponica Kishida, 1913 — Japan
 Segestria pacifica Banks, 1891 — USA
 Segestria pusiola Simon, 1882 — Spain, France (Corsica), Algeria
 Segestria saeva Walckenaer, 1837 — New Zealand
 Segestria sbordonii Brignoli, 1984 — Greece (Crete)
 Segestria senoculata (Linnaeus, 1758) — Europe, Turkey, Caucasus, Iran, Japan
 Segestria senoculata castrodunensis Gétaz, 1889 — Switzerland
 Segestria shtoppelae Fomichev & Marusik, 2020 — Kazakhstan
 Segestria turkestanica Dunin, 1986 — Central Asia

See also
 List of Segestriidae species

References

Araneomorphae genera
Cosmopolitan spiders
Segestriidae
Taxa named by Pierre André Latreille